Henri-Louis-Philippe Mougin (16 November 1841 Bourg-en-Bresse – 15 December 1916) was a Batalion Chief of the engineering, aide-de-camp of Raymond Adolphe Séré de Rivières

He was awarded to the Chevalier of the Legion of Honour in 1871 and Official of the Legion of Honour in 1908.

Officiers of the Légion d'honneur
Chevaliers of the Légion d'honneur
École Polytechnique alumni
Military personnel from Bourg-en-Bresse
1841 births
1916 deaths
French military engineers
Séré de Rivières system